Cristiano Souza (born August 2, 1982) is a Brazilian mixed martial artist who currently competes for the Bellator Fighting Championships in the Welterweight Division. He was a fighter on the first season of Fight Master: Bellator MMA

Mixed martial arts career

Bellator Fighting Championships
On September 17, 2011, Souza made his Bellator debut defeating John Kelly at Bellator 50 via unanimous decision.
 
On November 9, 2012, Souza defeated Robert Otani at Bellator 80 via knockout due to punches in round one.

Fight Master: Bellator MMA
On May 6, 2013, it was announced that Souza would be featured as a participant on Bellator Fighting Championships reality TV show Fight Master: Bellator MMA, competing as a Welterweight.

In his elimination fight to get on the show, Souza defeated Steve Montgomery via knockout in the first round. During the team selection, Souza chose Randy Couture to be his coach. In his preliminary fight, Souza faced Evan Cutts.  Despite controlling a majority of the fight, Souza lost to Cutts via triangle choke submission in the second round.

Bellator Return
Souza came back at Bellator 106 and was scheduled to fight Karo Parisyan but Parisyan withdrew due to injury and was replaced with Alejandro Gracia.  Souza controlled the first two rounds before taking down and submitting Gracia via rear naked choke in the third round.

In March 2014, Souza entered the Bellator Season 10 Welterweight tournament as a replacement. He faced Sam Oropeza in the opening round at Bellator 112 and lost via TKO in the first round.

Mixed martial arts record

|-
|Loss
|align=center|7–2
|Jose Caceres
|Submission (rear-naked choke)
|Fight Time 35
|
|align=center|2
|align=center|2:45
|Miami, Florida, United States
|
|-
|Loss
|align=center|7–1
|Sam Oropeza
|TKO (punches)
|Bellator 112
|
|align=center|1
|align=center|3:07
|Hammond, Indiana, United States
|Bellator Season 10 Welterweight Tournament Quarterfinals
|-
|Win
|align=center|7–0
|Alejandro Gracia
|Submission (rear naked choke)
|Bellator 106
|
|align=center| 3
|align=center| 3:06
|Long Beach, California, United States
|
|-
|Win
|align=center|6–0
|Robert Otani
|TKO (punches)
|Bellator 80
|
|align=center|1
|align=center|2:46
|Hollywood, Florida, United States
|
|-
|Win
|align=center|5–0
|John Kelly
|Decision (unanimous)
|Bellator 50
|
|align=center|3
|align=center|5:00
|Hollywood, Florida, United States
|
|-
|Win
|align=center|4–0
|Alex Rojas
|Submission (guillotine choke)
|CFA 1: The Title
|
|align=center|2
|align=center|3:19
|Miami, Florida, United States
|
|-
|Win
|align=center|3–0
|Rory Shallcross
|KO (punches)
|AFO 11: Fusion
|
|align=center|1
|align=center|1:37
|Tampa, Florida, United States
|
|-
|Win
|align=center|2–0
|Andrew Flickenger
|Submission (rear naked choke)
|AOF 8: Fury
|
|align=center|1
|align=center|2:12
|Estero, Florida, United States
|
|-
|Win
|align=center|1–0
|Pedro Rubio
|KO (punches)
|AOF 5: Rumble at Robarts 5
|
|align=center|1
|align=center|1:39
|Sarasota, Florida, United States
|

References

Living people
Welterweight mixed martial artists
Brazilian male mixed martial artists
Mixed martial artists utilizing Brazilian jiu-jitsu
Mixed martial artists utilizing capoeira
1982 births
Brazilian capoeira practitioners
Brazilian practitioners of Brazilian jiu-jitsu
People awarded a black belt in Brazilian jiu-jitsu